Bathyspinulidae is a family of bivalves belonging to the order Nuculanida.

Genera:
 Tindariopsis Verrill & Bush, 1897

References

Nuculanida
Bivalve families